Boroduli is a rural locality (a village) and the administrative center of Borodulskoye Rural Settlement, Vereshchaginsky District, Perm Krai, Russia. The population was 476 as of 2010. There are 23 streets.

Geography 
Boroduli is located 7 km east of Vereshchagino (the district's administrative centre) by road. Tolkovyata is the nearest rural locality.

References 

Rural localities in Vereshchaginsky District